The 101st district of the Texas House of Representatives consists of southern Arlington, a portion of southern Grand Prairie, and a very small part of eastern Mansfield. The current Representative is Chris Turner, who has represented the district since 2013.

Part of Joe Pool Lake is within the district.

References 

101